Bannu–Tank Branch Line was one of several branch lines in Pakistan, operated and maintained by Pakistan Railways. The line began at Bannu and ended at Tank Junction. It was known by locals as "choti rail", since it was the only  narrow gauge railway in the country. The line was dismantled in 1995.

History
The rail line was originally built by NWR as the Trans–Indus Railway in 1913, which extended from Kalabagh station to Bannu station, which today is part of the Daud Khel–Lakki Marwat Branch Line. The line was then further extended in 1916 to reach Tank Junction station. The line was also sometimes referred to as the Mari Indus Railway.

Closure
The line was dismantled in 1995.

Stations
 Bannu
 Aba Khel
 Naurang Serai
 Lakki Marwat Junction
 Shahbaz Khel Halt
 Pezu
 Tank Junction

See also
 Karachi–Peshawar Railway Line
 Railway lines in Pakistan

References

Closed railway lines in Pakistan
Railway lines opened in 1913
Railway lines closed in 1995
Railway stations on Bannu–Tank Branch Line
2 ft 6 in gauge railways in Pakistan